Reinaldo de las Mercedes Pared Pérez (25 September 1956 – 29 October 2021) was a Dominican politician. He represented Distrito Nacional in Chamber of Deputies from 1998 to 2002, and served in the Senate since 2006. Pared Pérez was president of the senate twice, between 2006 and 2014, and again between 2016 and 2020. A member of the Dominican Liberation Party, he was named general-secretary in 2001.

The government of the Republic of China (Taiwan) awarded Pared Pérez the Order of Brilliant Star Special Grand Cordon in June 2017.

The former secretary general of the Dominican Liberation Party, Reinaldo Pared Pérez, died this Thursday night in what appears to be a suicide.

Pérez was suffering from episodes of depression as a result of health problems caused by a cancer that was detected two years ago and for which he was undergoing treatment.

Pérez died by a suspected suicide on 29 October 2021, at the age of 65 in a summer residence in Juan Dolio, where he spent most of his time after the illness.

References

1956 births
2021 deaths
2021 suicides
Dominican Liberation Party politicians
Recipients of the Order of Brilliant Star
Presidents of the Senate of the Dominican Republic
Members of the Chamber of Deputies of the Dominican Republic
People from Santo Domingo
Suicides by firearm in the Dominican Republic
Politicians who committed suicide